Jonathan Nahimana (born 12 December 1999) is a Burundian footballer who plays as a goalkeeper for Tanzanian club Kinondoni Municipal Council and the Burundi national football team.

References

External links

1999 births
Living people
Burundian footballers
Burundi international footballers
Association football goalkeepers
Vital'O F.C. players
2019 Africa Cup of Nations players
Kinondoni Municipal Council F.C. players
Burundi Premier League players
Burundian expatriate footballers
Burundian expatriate sportspeople in Tanzania
Expatriate footballers in Tanzania
Sportspeople from Bujumbura
Tanzanian Premier League players